William Pitt Kalanimoku or Kalaimoku ( – February 7, 1827) was a High Chief who functioned similarly to a prime minister of the Hawaiian Kingdom during the reigns of Kamehameha I, Kamehameha II and the beginning of the reign of  Kamehameha III. He was called The Iron Cable of Hawaii because of his abilities.

Life
Kalanimoku was born  at Kauiki, Maui, circa 1768. His father was Kekuamanoha and his mother was Kamakahukilani, the niece of his father. Through his father he was a grandson of Kekaulike, the King or Moi of Maui. Through his mother he was great-grandson of Kekaulike. He was cousin of Kaahumanu, Kaheiheimālie, and Namahana Piia, Kamehameha's three wives; Kuakini, later served as Governor of Hawaii; and Keeaumoku II, later served as Governor of Maui.  His siblings included Boki, later served as Governor of Oahu; Kahakuhaakoi Wahinepio, later served as Governor of Maui, and Manono II, the wife of Keaoua Kekuaokalani.  Both his sisters were at one time wives of Kamehameha I which may explain how he gained his power.

At the time, his name was often spelled Karaimoku by Hawaiians and contemporaries alike, and even Kalanimoku, himself, signed his name as such. Other spellings were Kalaimoku, Crymoku or Crimoku. He adopted the name William Pitt after his contemporary the Prime Minister of Great Britain, William Pitt the Younger. He was frequently addressed as Mr. Pitt or Billy Bitt. He served as Kamehameha I's chief minister and treasurer succeeding his uncle Keeaumoku Pāpaiahiahi. He had  great natural abilities in both governmental and business affairs. He was well liked and respected by foreigners, who learned from experience to rely on his words. He was called "the iron cable of Hawaii" because of his abilities.

Kalanimoku had many wives including Kiliwehi, Kuwahine, Likelike and Akahi. Historian Samuel Kamakau and American missionary Hiram Bingham I recounted an incident in 1805 when Kalanimoku burned down much of Honolulu and the island of Oahu after Kuwahine deserted him for Kuakini. The burning and destruction of property, which was sanctioned by Kamehameha I, did not cease until she was found and returned to him.

In 1819, he was baptized a Roman Catholic aboard the French ship Uranie, in the presence of Kuhina Nui (Premier) Kaahumanu and King Kamehameha II.
The event depicted in a watercolor by ship's artist Jacques Arago (1790—1855), who wrote and illustrated accounts of the Hawaiian Islands during Freycinet expedition.

Kalanimoku led an army against the revolt of Kekuaokalani in December 1819 in the successful battle of Kuamoo.

He served as regent along with Queen Kaahumanu while Kamehameha II traveled to London in 1823, and to Kamehameha III after Kamehameha II's death in 1824.

In his later years his vision dimmed and one of his eyes was defective. He suffered from dropsy through 1826 and the disease became alarming in the following year. He died at Kamakahonu (the old home of Kamehameha I) in Kailua Kona, Hawaii Island on February 7, 1827. He had only one son, William Pitt Leleiohoku I, who married Ruth Keelikōlani and had their only son John William Pitt Kīnaʻu, who died while still a teenager.

References

Bibliography

External links

1768 births
1827 deaths
Royalty of the Hawaiian Kingdom
House of Kekaulike
Hawaiian Kingdom politicians
Native Hawaiian politicians
Converts to Roman Catholicism from pagan religions
Roman Catholic Diocese of Honolulu
Hawaiian Kingdom Roman Catholics
Deaths from edema
Hawaii (island)
Commanders-in-chief of the Hawaiian Kingdom